Awapuni is an area and council ward of Palmerston North, Manawatū-Whanganui, New Zealand. It is located south west of Palmerston North Central. The New Zealand Ministry for Culture and Heritage gives a translation of "blocked-up river" for Awapuni.

Te Hotu Manawa Marae and its Tūturu Pumau meeting house are located in Awapuni. It is a tribal meeting ground for the Rangitāne hapū of Ngāti Kapuārangi, Ngāti Rangiaranaki, Ngāti Rangitepaia, Ngāti Hineaute and Ngāti Tauira.

Demographics

It had a population of 8,292 at the 2018 New Zealand census, an increase of 447 people (5.7%) since the 2013 census, and an increase of 345 people (4.3%) since the 2006 census. There were 3,003 households. There were 3,957 males and 4,335 females, giving a sex ratio of 0.91 males per female, with 1,812 people (21.9%) aged under 15 years, 1,830 (22.1%) aged 15 to 29, 3,408 (41.1%) aged 30 to 64, and 1,242 (15.0%) aged 65 or older.

Ethnicities were 76.4% European/Pākehā, 20.3% Māori, 6.2% Pacific peoples, 10.7% Asian, and 3.2% other ethnicities (totals add to more than 100% since people could identify with multiple ethnicities).

The proportion of people born overseas was 18.8%, compared with 27.1% nationally.

Although some people objected to giving their religion, 51.1% had no religion, 35.2% were Christian, 1.3% were Hindu, 1.6% were Muslim, 0.6% were Buddhist and 3.0% had other religions.

Of those at least 15 years old, 1,461 (22.5%) people had a bachelor or higher degree, and 1,122 (17.3%) people had no formal qualifications. The employment status of those at least 15 was that 3,159 (48.8%) people were employed full-time, 891 (13.8%) were part-time, and 285 (4.4%) were unemployed.

Suburbs

Awapuni North

Awapuni North features Awapuni School and Kia Toa Sports Club rooms. It is also the location of Awapuni and Alexander Parks, and Rugby, Panako and Raleigh Reserves.

College Street divides Awapuni North from Awapuni South.

Awapuni North had a population of 3,503 in 2018.

Awapuni South

Awapuni South contains Riverdale School and Awapuni School, Awatapu College and a chapel of the Church of Jesus Christ of Latter-day Saints. It features Riverdale, Ahimate and Paneiri Parks; the riverside Dittmer Drive Reserve includes a stopbank and walking track.

The area College Street divides Awapuni North from Awapuni South. The suburb is bounded by the Manawatu River. Dittmer Drive (which runs the bank of the river) has a stopbank, which is the first defence if there is a chance of flooding. There are many large houses along Dittmer Drive.

The area had a resident population of 3,366 in 2018.

Maraetarata

Maraetarata, previously called Awapuni West, is centred around Awapuni Racecourse. It features Rangitaane, Mangaone, Otira and Totaranui parks.

Maxwells Line divides Maraetarata from Awapuni North and Awapuni South. The Mangaone Stream mostly forms the western boundary. Other features of Maraetarata include the Awapuni Landfill.  Maraetarata is the site of the ancient Awapuni Lagoon, upon which the racecourse is now situated.

The area had a population of 537 in 2018.

Awapuni Racecourse

Awapuni is known nationally for having the Awapuni Racecourse, the racing centre for thoroughbred horses (gallopers) in the Manawatu region. The Awapuni Racecourse holds a number of nationally significant races, including the:

 Manawatu Sires Produce Stakes which is a Group One race (the highest level) for 2 year olds run over 1400m in late March or early April.  This race is arguably New Zealand's best race for 2 year old horses. 
 Awapuni Gold Cup, an open class Group Two race over 2000m also raced in late March or early April, which has been won by some of New Zealand's greatest horses such as the Japan Cup winner Horlicks,  and Balmerino. 
 Manawatu Classic, a Group Three event over 2000m for 3 year olds. 
 Manawatu Breeders Stakes, a Group Three Weight-for-age event over 2000m in April.
 Merial Metric Mile, an open class Group Three event in mid September.
 Eulogy Stakes, a Group Three event for 3 year old fillies over 1550min mid December.
 Manawatu Challenge Stakes, a Group Two Weight-for-age event over 1400m, in late December. 
 Manawatu Cup, a Group Three open class event over 2100m in late December.

In the past there were a number of race tracks in the region, such as Feilding and Marton, which have been closed and some of those Club's key races are now held at the Awapuni Racecourse, thereby preserving their history such as the:

 Feilding Gold Cup, a Listed race (the 4th tier) for open class horses over 2100m in early November.
 Marton Cup, a Listed race for open class horses over 2100m in early January.
 Rangitikei Gold Cup, a Listed race for open class horses over 1550m in May.

The Awapuni Racecourse has a large function centre and is a racehorse training centre used by a number of prominent horse trainers.

See also 
Awapuni railway station

References

Suburbs of Palmerston North
Manawatū-Whanganui
Populated places on the Manawatū River